Bobai railway station is a railway station located in Bobai County, Yulin, Guangxi, China. It is an intermediate station on the Yulin–Tieshangang railway but is the terminus for passenger service. There is one service per day to and from Nanning railway station.

History
Freight service began on 1 May 2015. Passenger service began on 1 April 2016.

References 

Railway stations in Guangxi
Railway stations in China opened in 2015